Pieter Mulier I (ca.1610, Haarlem – 1659, Haarlem), was a Dutch Golden Age painter.

Biography
According to the RKD, he married in 1635 and became a member of the Haarlem Guild of St. Luke in 1638. He was known for Italianate landscapes and seascapes in the manner of Simon de Vlieger and Jan van Goyen. He was the teacher of his son Pieter Mulier II and Frans de Hulst.

References

Pieter Mulier on Artnet

1610 births
1659 deaths
Artists from Haarlem
Dutch Golden Age painters
Dutch male painters
Dutch marine artists
Painters from Haarlem